Antelope Ridge is a group of hills in Juab County, Utah.  It is located east of Topaz Mountain.

References

Mountain ranges of Utah